Hamun Sazeh Football Club is an Iranian football club based in Zahedan. They currently compete in the Iran Football's 2nd Division.

Season-by-Season

The table below shows the achievements of the club in various competitions.

See also
 2014–15 Iran Football's 2nd Division

References

Football clubs in Iran
Association football clubs established in 2014
2014 establishments in Iran